Seven Psychopaths is a 2012 satirical black comedy crime drama film directed, written, and co-produced by Martin McDonagh and starring Colin Farrell, Sam Rockwell, Woody Harrelson, and Christopher Walken, with Tom Waits, Abbie Cornish, Olga Kurylenko, and Željko Ivanek in supporting roles. The film marks the second collaboration among McDonagh, Farrell, and Ivanek, following the director's In Bruges (2008). It is a co-production of the United States and the United Kingdom.

Seven Psychopaths had its world premiere on 7 September 2012 at the Toronto International Film Festival, and was theatrically released in the United States and Canada on 12 October 2012, and in the United Kingdom on 5 December 2012. The film received positive reviews from critics.

Plot

Marty is an alcoholic writer in Los Angeles stuck on his new screenplay, Seven Psychopaths—he has the title, but he can't imagine the seven titular characters. His best friend, Billy, is a struggling actor who makes a living kidnapping dogs and collecting rewards for their safe return. His partner-in-crime is Hans, a religious man, whose wife Myra is in hospital for cancer treatment.

Billy shows Marty a story in the paper about the "Jack of Diamonds" killer—who only kills "mid-to-high-ranking members of the Italian-American mafia", leaving jack of diamonds playing cards on his victims as a signature—and suggests he be used as one of the seven. Marty agrees. Later that day, Marty comes up with his second psychopath: the "Quaker", who stalks his daughter's killer for decades to drive him to suicide. When Marty tells the story at his girlfriend's party that evening, Billy gets frustrated—he heard the story from "a friend" and retold it to Marty, who was so drunk he forgot it wasn't his own idea. He wants to collaborate with Marty as a screenwriting duo, but is too embarrassed to ask directly.

Billy puts an ad in the paper inviting psychopaths to share their stories with Marty for the script. Zachariah Rigby approaches them, sharing his story of having been a part of a serial killer duo (with Maggie, his now-ex-lover) who killed other serial killers: the Texarkana Moonlight Murderer, the Cleveland Torso Killer, and the Zodiac killer. However, as a condition of allowing his story to be used, Zachariah wants Marty to include his phone number in the credits in the hope that Maggie will see the movie and seek him out again. Marty agrees. He also adds another psychopath to the script: a former Viet Cong fighter who travels to the U.S., dressed as a priest, to enact revenge on the soldiers responsible for the Mỹ Lai massacre.

One of the many dogs stolen by Billy and Hans is Bonny, a Shih Tzu, the beloved pet of Charlie Costello, an unpredictable and violent gangster. His thugs discover Hans' connection to the kidnapping. They threaten to kill Marty and Hans, but the Jack of Diamonds killer arrives and kills the thugs, then leaves without saying anything. Hans and Marty flee the scene, but Charlie traces Myra to the cancer ward and kills her when she refuses to tell him anything.

Billy goes to meet his girlfriend, Angela, who is also Charlie's girlfriend. After telling her he kidnapped Bonny, she snitches to Charlie. Billy receives a call from Hans to tell him that Charlie killed Myra, so Billy shoots Angela in retaliation and leaves a playing card in her hand. Charlie arrives at Billy's and discovers many packs of playing cards with the jack of diamonds missing, realizing he is the Jack of Diamonds killer.

Marty, Billy, and Hans leave for the desert with Bonny. After Marty retells "his" Quaker story during dinner at a bar, Hans reveals that he is the real-life Quaker. When the trio arrive to the desert, they set up camp. Hans is impressed with Marty's screenplay draft, especially the character of the Viet Cong fake-priest, but Marty admits that he's increasingly uninterested in violence and plans to leave that story line unfinished rather than resort to cliché. They pass the time discussing their different endings for the screenplay, with Billy suggesting a shootout between all of the psychopaths where the Jack of Diamonds killer dies a tragic hero.

While at a store to buy food, Marty and Hans see a headline saying that Billy is wanted in connection with the Jack of Diamonds killings. They return to the camp shaken. Marty gets drunk while Billy and Hans take peyote. When confronted, Billy reveals that he assumed the Jack of Diamonds persona to inspire Marty, but Marty angrily declares he will never write with Billy and they must go home. 

Meanwhile, Hans has a vision of Myra in a "grey place," leading him to doubt his belief in the afterlife. He ignores Marty's reassurances that his vision was a peyote-induced hallucination. Billy sets the car on fire, stranding the trio, then calls Charlie to give him their location and force his dramatic shootout ending. To alleviate Hans' doubts about heaven so he'll participate in the shootout, Billy claims to have impersonated Myra; but, not able to describe precisely what Myra had said in the vision, Hans walks away into the desert.

Charlie arrives alone and unarmed, apart from a flare gun. An enraged Billy shoots him, feeling cheated. Hans stumbles across Charlie's thugs waiting nearby, led by Paolo, but the police show up at the same time. Marty drives away with Charlie, intending to take him to a hospital, when Billy realizes the flare gun's purpose and fires it. Paolo starts to lead his men to the flare, but Hans pretends to draw a weapon, causing Paulo to shoot him in front of the police. Before dying, he says, "It isn't grey at all."

The thugs head towards the signal with police in pursuit and intercept Marty and Charlie, who reveals that he only suffered a flesh wound. With backup, Charlie returns to Billy for a stand-off, holding Marty and Bonny hostage respectively. Charlie releases Marty and shoots Billy just as the police arrive. Charlie and Paulo are arrested, but Bonny stays at the dying Billy's side. Marty catches up with Hans' body, finding a tape recorder with a suggestion for how to end the Viet Cong fighter's story with hope: his revenge is revealed as a fantasy, the dying thoughts of the first Buddhist monk to self-immolate in peaceful protest of the Vietnam War.

Marty, having adopted Bonny, finishes the screenplay. Some 
time later, after Seven Psychopaths is shown in theaters, Zachariah calls and threatens to kill Marty for not leaving a message to Maggie as promised. On hearing Marty's weary and resigned acceptance of his fate, Zachariah realizes his experiences have left him a changed man and decides to spare him.

Cast

Production
The first casting announcements were made on 12 May 2011. Mickey Rourke left The Expendables 2 to co-star in the film. He later dropped out of Seven Psychopaths after disagreements with McDonagh, calling him a "jerk-off." He was replaced by Woody Harrelson. Of the incident, McDonagh said "I was fine with it. Mickey's a great actor [...] I've known Woody [Harrelson] for years and years, and he was a perfect choice for this too. He's got those great dramatic elements which he's shown in Rampart recently, and he's always been a fantastic comedian. You need that in this – someone who can be out-and-out funny, but also turn sinister on a dime."

The film was shot in Los Angeles and Joshua Tree National Park, Twentynine Palms, California. Filming was completed late 2011.

Music
The film's score was composed by Carter Burwell, who previously composed the score to McDonagh's In Bruges. Lakeshore Records released the soundtrack digitally on 23 October 2012, with a physical release date of 20 November 2012.

Reception

Box office
Seven Psychopaths was released in North America on 12 October 2012 and opened in 1,480 theaters in the United States. It grossed $1,360,000 on its opening day and $4,275,000 in its opening weekend, ranking #9 with a per theater average of $2,889. During its second weekend, it dropped down to #11 and grossed $3,273,480, with a per theater average of $2,212. By its third weekend, it dropped to #15 and made $1,498,350, with a per theater average of $1,494. It was released 5 December 2012 in the United Kingdom.

Critical response
Seven Psychopaths received positive reviews from critics. Review aggregator Rotten Tomatoes gives the film a score of 83%, based on 219 reviews, with an average rating of 7.1/10. The site's critical consensus reads, "Seven Psychopaths delivers sly cinematic commentary while serving up a heaping helping of sharp dialogue and gleeful violence." At Metacritic, which assigns a weighted mean rating out of 100 to reviews from mainstream critics, the film holds a score of 66 out of 100, based on 43 critics, indicating "generally favorable reviews." Audiences surveyed by CinemaScore gave the film an average grade of "B+" on an A+ to F scale.

Eric Kohn of IndieWire gave the film a positive review and an "A−" grade, praising McDonagh's writing, and stating that it "hits a unique pitch between dark, bloody satire and interpersonal conflicts that makes his finest work play like a combination of Quentin Tarantino and Aaron Sorkin." About the film itself, he wrote, "A less controlled and slapdash character piece than In Bruges, McDonagh's new movie benefits greatly from a plethora of one-liners that toy with crime movie clichés in the unlikely context of writerly obsessions." Claudia Puig of USA Today also gave the film a positive review, writing that "men in movies are often just overgrown boys, and Seven Psychopaths is out to prove it – in the most twisted, hilarious way possible." Roger Ebert of Chicago Sun-Times gave the film three-and-a-half stars out of four. He praised the performances of main cast members and McDonagh's writing, stating that "Walken sometimes leans toward self-parody, but here his performance has a delicate, contained strangeness. All of the actors are good, and Farrell wisely allows the showier performances to circle around him. Like any screenwriter – like Tarantino, for example, who is possibly McDonagh's inspiration here – he brings these people into being and stands back in amazement." About the film, he added, "This is a delightfully goofy, self-aware movie that knows it is a movie." Lisa Schwarzbaum of Entertainment Weekly gave the film a "B+" grade, stating, "An energetically demented psycho-killer comedy set in faux-noir L.A., Seven Psychopaths rollicks along to the unique narrative beat and language stylings of Anglo-Irish writer-director Martin McDonagh (In Bruges), channeling Quentin Tarantino."

David Rooney of The Hollywood Reporter praised the performances of the main cast members, stating, "As creatively bankrupt Marty, Farrell is in subdued mode here, his performance largely defined by the endless expressivity of his eyebrows. He serves as an excellent foil for Rockwell, whose line readings continually dance between knowingness and idiocy, and Walken, who ventures as far into deadpan as you can go while remaining conscious. And Harrelson has fun contrasting his devotion to Bonny with his contempt for humanity." He wrote about the film that "while it's way behind the Pulp Fiction curve, Seven Psychopaths can be terrifically entertaining." Catherine Shoard of The Guardian gave the film four stars out of five, and wrote, "There are scenes of complete brilliance, Walken is better than he's been in years, cute plot loops and grace notes." Peter Travers of Rolling Stone gave the film three stars out of four, stating, "Blood splatters, heads explode, and McDonagh takes sassy, self-mocking shots at the very notion of being literary in Hollywood. It's crazy-killer fun." Ty Burr of Boston Globe also gave the film three stars out of four, stating that the film is "absurdly entertaining even after it disappears up its own hindquarters in the last act, and it gives some of our weirder actors ample room to play."

Michael Phillips of Chicago Tribune gave the film three stars out of four, writing that "the result is a clever, violent daydream. But McDonagh's skill behind the camera has grown considerably since In Bruges. And the way he writes, he's able to attract the ideal actors into his garden of psychopathology." Dana Stevens of Slate magazine gave the film a positive review, stating, "It's at once a gangster movie, a buddy comedy, and a meta-fictional exploration of the limits of both genres - and if that sounds impossible to pull off, well, McDonagh doesn't, quite. But the pure sick brio of Seven Psychopaths takes it a long way." Richard Corliss of Time magazine also gave the film a positive review, writing that "small in stature but consistently entertaining, Seven Psychopaths is a vacation from consequence for the Tony- and Oscar-winning author, and an unsupervised play date for his cast of screw-loose stars." James Berardinelli of ReelViews gave the film two-and-a-half stars out of four, stating, "On balance, one could argue that Seven Psychopaths warrants a better rating than a mediocre **1/2, but the aftertaste is so bitter that it diminishes the sweetness that started off the meal."

Peter Debruge of Variety magazine gave the film a mixed review, writing that "the film's overall tone is so cartoony, it's easy to imagine someone spinning off a macabre animated series of the same name....." and that "compared to McDonagh's best work for stage (The Lieutenant of Inishmore) and screen (In Bruges), Seven Psychopaths feels like either an older script knocking around the bottom of a drawer or a new one hastily tossed off between more ambitious projects." Kevin Jagernauth of The Playlist also gave the film a mixed review, stating, "somewhat spastic and overcooked, Seven Psychopaths might have a few too many."

Awards and nominations

References

External links
 
 
 
 
 

2012 films
2012 black comedy films
2010s crime comedy-drama films
2010s satirical films
2010s English-language films
British black comedy films
British crime comedy-drama films
British satirical films
American black comedy films
American crime comedy-drama films
American satirical films
Self-reflexive films
Metafictional works
Film4 Productions films
Films about alcoholism
Films about dogs
Films about drugs
Films about murderers
Films about screenwriters
Films set in Los Angeles
Films shot in California
Films shot in Los Angeles
Films directed by Martin McDonagh
Films produced by Graham Broadbent
Films scored by Carter Burwell
CBS Films films
2010s American films
2010s British films